Ramsay is a French publishing house belonging to the Vilo group.

History 
Les Editions Ramsay were founded in 1976 in the form of a Société à responsabilité limitée by Jean-Pierre Ramsay, who sold them in 1982 to Gaumont. After a long empty passage and the threat posed to the publishing house by the lawsuit filed for infringement against Regine Deforges by the rightholders of Gone with the wind, it was ceded to Éditions Régine Deforges

Following the filing of bankruptcy and the judicial liquidation of Éditions Régine Deforges in 1992, Editions Ramsay were bought out by Michel Lafon and then in 1998 by the Vilo group.

In 2014, Ramsay publishes a book on PresidentEdgar Faure entitled Edgar Faure, secrets d’État, secrets de famille, written by his grandson, Rodolphe Oppenheimer-Faure and Luc Corlouër, prefaced by Jean-Michel Baylet and Jean-Louis Borloo.

External links 
 Editions Ramsay on La Cause Littéraire
 SOCIETE NOUVELLE DES EDITIONS RAMSAY on Société.com
 Ramsay on BiblioMonde
 Éditeur : Ramsay on Librairie Eyrolles
 Ramsay publications on Rue des Livres

Publishing companies of France
Publishing companies established in 1976
French companies established in 1976